Inge Donnepp (13 December 1918 – 31 July 2002) was a German lawyer and politician (SPD). She was the first woman minister of Justice of a German state. Because of her political commitment, she was called in the SPD also "mother Courage of the Ruhr area".

Early life and education 
Donnepp was born in Unna.  She studied New Philology at the University of Heidelberg. She attended law school at Rostock and Berlin, receiving her degree in 1947. She worked as a lawyer from 1947 until 1954. She became a judge at the end of 1954, at the social courts of Münster and Gelsenkirchen.

Death 
She died in Recklinghausen.

References

German women lawyers
20th-century German lawyers
20th-century German women
1918 births
2002 deaths
20th-century women lawyers
Heidelberg University alumni